Emmanuel Tshituka (born 16 June 2000) is a Congolese-born South African rugby union player for the  in the Pro14 Rainbow Cup SA. His regular position is flanker.

Tshituka was named in the  squad for the Pro14 Rainbow Cup SA competition.

References

South African rugby union players
Living people
Rugby union flankers
Lions (United Rugby Championship) players
2000 births
Golden Lions players
Democratic Republic of the Congo rugby union players